Emine Sultan ("trustworthy" or "benign"; 1 September 1696 –  1739) was an Ottoman princess, daughter of Sultan Mustafa II and half-sister of Sultans Mahmud I and Osman III of the Ottoman Empire.

Life

Birth
Emine Sultan was born on 1 September 1696. At the time of her birth her father was traveling to Austria and part of his harem awaited him in Belgrade, while the rest remained in Edirne. Therefore Emine could have been born in Belgrade or Edirne. She was the second daughter of Sultan Mustafa II.

In 1703 her father was deposed in favor of his younger brother Ahmed III and she, with her half-sisters, locked up in the Old Palace until her marriage.

Marriages
When Emine was five, Mustafa had her betrothed to the beylerbey (governor-general) of Damascus, Hasan Pasha. This engagement was annulled in 1701 and the same year she was engaged to Çorlulu Ali Pasha, then her father's sword-bearer.

On 8 April 1708, Emine on her uncle Sultan Ahmed III's behest was wed to Çorlulu Ali Pasha, then Grand Vizier. She had 12 and her husband 38. Both Emine's trousseau and her wedding processions headed for the grand vizier's palace which was just across the road from the Alay Köşkü. Both processions, led by top dignitaries, left from the Imperial Gate, passing by the Cebehane (the Church of St Irene), the Baths of Hagia Sophia, and through the street called Soğukçeşme to reach the grand vizier's palace. Her husband gifted her diamonds, rubies, emeralds and other jewels, plus 2.000 piece of gold.

After Ali Pasha's death in 1711, Emine married Recep Pasha, the beylerbey of Trabzon Eyalet in 1712, after, Ibrahim Pasha in 1724. She divorced one of them almost immediately, without even seeing him to warn him, because she judged that his organization of the pilgrimage to Mecca was "detestable" and that, for this, he had shamed himself, her and the whole imperial family. Finally, she married Abdullah Pasha on 1 June 1728. The latter died in 1736.

Not are know children born by this marriages. 

After her fourth marriage she chose not to remarry anymore.

Charity
In 1715, Emine commissioned a fountain near the Çivizade Mosque in Topkapı.

Death
Emine Sultan died in 1739, and was buried in Mevlevihane Kapısı, Istanbul.

Ancestry

See also
 List of Ottoman princesses

References

Sources
 
 

1696 births
1739 deaths
17th-century Ottoman princesses
18th-century Ottoman princesses